The 2021–22 Dayton Flyers women's basketball team represent the University of Dayton during the 2021–22 NCAA Division I women's basketball season. The Flyers, led by third-year head coach Shauna Green, play their home games at UD Arena and are members of the Atlantic 10 Conference. They finished the season 25–5, 14–1 to win the regular season championship. They advanced to the finals of the A-10 women's tournament where they lost to UMass. They received an at-large bid to the 2022 NCAA Division I women's basketball tournament.

Media

Dayton Flyers Sports Network
The Dayton Flyers Sports Network will broadcast Flyers games off of their athletic website, DaytonFlyers.com, with Shane White on the call. Most home games will also be featured on the A-10 Digital Network. Select games will be televised.

Roster

Schedule

|-
!colspan=9 style=| Exhibition

|-
!colspan=9 style=| Non-conference regular season

|-
!colspan=9 style=| Atlantic 10 regular season

|-
!colspan=9 style=| Atlantic 10 Tournament

|-
!colspan=9 style=| NCAA tournament

Rankings
2021–22 NCAA Division I women's basketball rankings

See also
 2021–22 Dayton Flyers men's basketball team

References

Dayton
Dayton Flyers women's basketball seasons
Dayton
2021 in sports in Ohio
2022 in sports in Ohio